Borneo Cup (Malay: Piala Borneo) is a football tournament held in East Malaysia and Brunei.  The tournament was played in Borneo since the 1950s, perhaps earlier. Before the establishment of Malaysia on 16 September 1963, the tournament was contested by three national teams, North Borneo, Sarawak and Brunei. After North Borneo and Sarawak formed Malaysia together with Malaya and Singapore, it competed as states of Malaysia.

In 1977, the tournament champions Sabah qualify for the Malaysia Cup. The following year, the tournament served as the Malaysia Cup east zone qualifying round. In the 2010s, there is an effort to revive the Cup by the Sabah Football Association (SAFA), but with the absence of sponsors and the tight schedule of the Brunei team in the S.League became a major barrier to the efforts.

History 

The Borneo Football Championship was first played by British Crown colony officials who took over the management of British North Borneo from the North Borneo Chartered Company in 1946 after the Second World War. It was then officially called the Borneo Cup in 1962. The oldest football club in Borneo, Kuching Wanderers FC (now known as the Kuching Football Association) can be said to be the pioneer of this tournament in the era of British rule. Sabah, which is known as North Borneo at that time became the inaugural champion in 1962. The Sabah team then won another 12 titles from 23 Borneo Cup editions until 1988. Sarawak won six times while Brunei won only four times. Sabah who became the Borneo Cup champion in 1977 was the first team from Borneo Island to compete in the Malaysia Cup. The Football Association of Malaysia (FAM) also invited Sarawak and Brunei to compete in the Burnley Cup (which is now known as the President's Cup). In 1989, the Borneo Cup was abolished after the failure of the team to conclude an agreement with FAM to join the Semi-Pro League. Brunei became the last edition champion in 1988.

Champions

References 

International association football competitions hosted by Malaysia
International association football competitions hosted by Brunei